Axel Nepraunik (born 3 February 1945) is an Austrian sprinter. He competed in the men's 100 metres at the 1972 Summer Olympics.

References

1945 births
Living people
Athletes (track and field) at the 1972 Summer Olympics
Austrian male sprinters
Olympic athletes of Austria
Athletes from Hamburg